Rudnica may refer to:

Montenegro
Rudnica, Pljevlja

Poland
Rudnica, Lower Silesian Voivodeship
Rudnica, West Pomeranian Voivodeship
Rudnica, Lubusz Voivodeship

Serbia
Rudnica (Raška)
Rudnica (Tutin)

Slovenia
Rudnica, Slovenia